Micropholis is group of trees in the family Sapotaceae, described as a genus in 1891.

These trees are native to tropical South America, Mesoamerica, and the West Indies. Most are locally known as "cafetos", literally meaning "coffee plants". But while both Micropholis and the coffeeplant genus Coffea are asterids, the present genus is part of the Ericales – a quite basal asterid lineage –, while Coffea belongs to the more advanced Gentianales.

They are valued for their wood, which is used as timber, for construction and as firewood; many species are threatened by overexploitation and habitat destruction. Also, they are often used as part of catuaba, a decoction from various tree's bark claimed to have aphrodisiac and stimulant properties.

Caimitillo verde (M. garciniifolia) is an important food source of the nearly-extinct Puerto Rican amazon bird (Amazona vittata).

Species

References

 
Sapotaceae genera
Taxonomy articles created by Polbot